Edward A. Spiegel (1931 — January 2, 2020) was an American professor of astronomy at Columbia University. He worked on convection theory and on the application of fluid dynamics to astrophysics.

Career
In the 1960s his research focused on turbulence and on chaos theory, returning to mathematical aspects of that subject from 1975 to 1985.  In the late 1980s he concentrated on mathematical pattern theory in fluids and other systems.  Afterwards,   Spiegel's work focused on models of the solar cycle and radiative processes in hot stars.  He authored or co-authored more than 100 papers involving collaborations with over 60 individuals; these papers have been cited well in excess of 3000 times.

"A thermally excited non-linear oscillator"
. by E.A. Spiegel and D.W. Moore contains a discussion of chaotic dynamics in terms of the wandering from one unstable periodic orbit to another. Their prescient vision anticipated much of our present day understanding of strange attractors.  Like Edward Lorenz's famous paper, which appeared just a few years earlier, this paper provided one of the first models that showed how simple fluid systems can display complex dynamics.

"Cosmic Arrhythmias" in "Chaos in Astrophysics" (Reidel 1985) is a compendium of Edward Spiegel's ideas for rationalizing cosmic phenomena. The article talks about the philosophy of why low-dimensional systems are relevant, useful and important in astrophysics. Between the lines, is the understanding that these ideas extend well beyond the subject of astrophysics. The work also cites some specific cosmic examples where low-dimensional dynamics and chaos theory may provide a key to understanding the astrophysical phenomena.

His insights and ideas have had a long-term effect on astrophysics.  For example, Spiegel's work on vortices in disks led to many papers in the 1990s, with vortices now recognized as key ingredients to the mechanisms by which disks maintain an accretion flux and how planets are able to form.  His work on photo-hydrodynamics is now recognized as potentially important in pulsars, and the Moore-Spiegel oscillator and chaos have become influential from 1980s onward.  He also coined the terms "blazar" and "photon bubble".

Awards
Awarded a Guggenheim Fellowship in 1974

References

External links
 Research page at Columbia

1931 births
2020 deaths
21st-century American physicists
American astronomers
Place of birth missing
Place of death missing
University of Michigan alumni